Iranian Persian, Western Persian or Western Farsi, natively simply known as Persian, refers to the varieties of the modern Persian language spoken in Iran and by minorities in neighboring countries, as well as by Iranian communities throughout the world. These are mutually intelligible with other varieties of Persian, including Afghanistan's Dari and Tajikistan's Tajik.

Name
Iran's national language has been called, apart from Persian or Farsi, by names such as Iranian Persian, Western Persian and Western Farsi, exclusively. Officially, the national language of Iran is designated simply as Persian.

ISO code
The international language-encoding standard ISO 639-1 uses the code fa for the Persian language in general, as its coding system is mostly based on the native-language designations. The more detailed standard ISO 639-3 uses the code fas for the dialects spoken across Iran and Afghanistan. This consists of the individual languages Dari and Iranian Persian. The code pes is used for Iranian Persian, exclusively.

Announcement of the Academy about the name of the Persian language in foreign languages

On November 19, 2005, the Academy of Persian Language and Literature delivered a pronouncement on the name of the Persian language, rejecting any use of the word Farsi (instead of English Persian, German Persisch, Spanish persa, French persan, etc.) in foreign languages.

The announcement reads:
 Persian has been used in a variety of publications including cultural, scientific, and diplomatic documents for centuries and, therefore, it carries a very significant historical and cultural meaning. Hence, changing Persian to Farsi would negate this established important precedent.
 Changing the usage from Persian to Farsi may give the impression that "Farsi" is a new language, although this may well be the intention of some users of Farsi.
 Changing the usage may also give the impression that "Farsi" is a dialect used in some parts of Iran rather than the predominant (and official) language of the country.
 The word Farsi has never been used in any research paper or university document in any Western language, and the proposal to begin using it would create doubt and ambiguity about the name of the official language of Iran.

Supporting this announcement, gradually other institutions and literary figures separately took similar actions throughout the world.

History
The main dynamics of the linguistic evolution of modern Persian are political and social changes such as population shifts, the advancement of particular regions, and the rise of ideological influences. In Iran, the Safavid period in particular initiated a number of sociolinguistic changes that affected the country's national language, reflecting the political and ideological separation of Iran from Central Asia and Afghanistan. It is likely that the multiple relocations of the capital city of Iran itself influenced the development of a distinctive metropolitan sociolect that would affect Persian dialects throughout the country.

During the late 12th and late 15th or early 17th centuries in Iran, the vowel repertory of the Persian language was reduced and a few consonants were altered in most of Iran's Western Persian dialects, while these features have been predominantly preserved in the Eastern dialects of Dari and Tajik up until the present day.

From the time of the Turco-Mongol invasions to the Safavid and subsequent Turkic-speaking dynasties, Persian received a number of lexical borrowings from Turkish, although never as much as those from Arabic. However, in contrast with the Tajik dialects of Central Asia, which are heavily influenced by Turkic, Persian in Iran has had its Turkic borrowings largely declined and assimilated. This is also reflective of the political realities in the Safavid, Qajar and Pahlavi periods.

Overall, Iran's Western Persian dialects appear to have changed more rapidly in lexicon and phonology than the Eastern Persian dialects of Afghanistan and Central Asia.

Comparison with other varieties
There are phonological, lexical, and morphological differences between the Persian dialects of Iran and elsewhere. There are no significant differences in the written forms of Iran's standard Persian and Afghanistan's standard Dari, other than regional idiomatic phrases. However, Iran's commonly spoken Persian is considerably different in pronunciation and some syntactic features from the dialects spoken in Afghanistan and Central Asia.

The dialects of Dari spoken in Northern, Central and Eastern Afghanistan, for example in Kabul, Mazar, and Badakhshan, have distinct features compared to Iran's Standard Persian. However, the dialect of Dari spoken in Western Afghanistan stands in between Dari and Iranian Persian. For instance, the Herati dialect shares vocabulary and phonology with both Dari and Iranian Persian. Likewise, the dialect of Persian in Eastern Iran, for instance in Mashhad, is quite similar to the Herati dialect of Afghanistan.

The Kabuli dialect has become the standard model of Dari in Afghanistan, as has the Tehrani dialect in relation to the Persian in Iran.

Phonology
The following are the primary phonological differences between Iran's mainstream Persian and the Persian dialects of Afghanistan and Tajikistan (Dari and Tajik), as well as Classical Persian.

 Most varieties of Persian spoken in Iran today lack the so-called "majhul" vowels. The "majhul" vowels  and  have been merged into  and  respectively in Iran's Standard Persian, whereas in Dari and Tajik, they have been preserved as separate.
Dari and Tajik, on the other hand, preserve the earlier forms. This does not occur in Dari or Tajik.
 The pronunciation of the labial consonant  is realized as a voiced labiodental fricative  in Iran's Standard Persian and Tajikistan's Standard Tajik, whereas Afghanistan's Standard Dari retains the (classical) bilabial pronunciation .
 The voiced uvular stop (in Perso-Arabic,  in Tajik) and the voiced velar fricative (in Perso-Arabic,  in Tajik) are convergent in Iran's Standard Persian (presumably under the influence of Turkic), whereas they are kept separate in Dari and Tajik.

References

Persian dialects and varieties
Languages of Iran
Languages of Iraq